Prepotherium is an extinct genus of megatheriid ground sloths that lived during the Miocene period. Fossils of Prepotherium have been found in the Collón Curá and Santa Cruz Formations of Argentina.

Prepotherium differed from Megatherium by being smaller and having a less exaggeratedly convex inferior border of the lower jaw.

Redefined species 
An additional species from Venezuela, P. venezuelanum, was named by R. Collins in 1935. from fossils found in the Portuguesa state and additional remains from the Acre state in Brazil. However, this species was later reclassified in its own genus, Pseudoprepotherium, as a basal member of another family of ground sloths, the Mylodontidae.

References

External links 
  PDVSA

Prehistoric placental genera
Prehistoric sloths
Miocene xenarthrans
Miocene mammals of South America
Mayoan
Laventan
Colloncuran
Friasian
Santacrucian
Neogene Argentina
Fossils of Argentina
Fossil taxa described in 1891
Taxa named by Florentino Ameghino
Austral or Magallanes Basin
Santa Cruz Formation